The Electoral (Amendment) Act 1974 (No. 7) was a law in Ireland which revised Dáil constituencies. It was a review of parliamentary constituencies passed in Ireland by the governing Fine Gael–Labour Party National Coalition. It was intended to secure their re-election, but instead backfired disastrously resulting in a landslide victory for their main opponents in Fianna Fáil. Consequently, the word Tullymander – combining the name of the minister James Tully with the word "gerrymander" – was coined.

It repealed the Electoral (Amendment) Act 1969, which had defined constituencies since the 1969 general election.

Background
The responsibility for drawing political boundaries was in the hands of the political parties and this had often been used for partisan advantage. The Minister for Local Government was directly responsible. Minister for Local Government James Tully's 1974 scheme proved to be more ambitious than most. By radically redrawing the boundaries in the Greater Dublin Area, creating a large number of three member constituencies rather than 4 or 5 member constituencies, it was hoped to capitalise on the relative weakness of the main opposition party Fianna Fáil in the capital. The hope was that both Fine Gael and Labour would win one seat each, leaving Fianna Fáil with a solitary seat in each constituency. This plan however relied on the Fianna Fáil vote remaining below the 40% mark in the Dublin area. In the event of it passing that figure, the danger was that Fianna Fáil could win two seats in each constituency even though other parties would have had a combined 60% of the vote. In practice, this is exactly what happened at the 1977 general election and the Tullymander scheme backfired.

A minor aspect of the constituency redrawing concerned the boundary of the constituencies of Meath and Louth. The Meath constituency had seen a population boom in the 1970s, as a result of improved economic performance. Therefore, an extra seat was to be expected. Tully himself was resident in Laytown at the time, and he tried to align the boundary of the Meath constituency so as to get extra votes from nearby expanding Drogheda included in Meath, and thereby bring in a second Labour TD in Meath.

Aftermath
The failure of this partisan scheme led to the creation of an independent Constituency Commission, chaired by a judge, starting with a special commission in 1980 under Justice Brian Walsh. The 1974 Act was repealed by the Electoral (Amendment) Act 1980, which created a new schedule of constituencies first used at the general election for the 22nd Dáil held on 11 June 1981.

From 1997, the Constituency Commission was put on a statutory basis. to manage all future constituency boundary revisions. This independent commission is constituted after each population census under the chairpersonship of a High Court or Supreme Court judge and is in charge of constituency definition in light of then current demographics.

Summary table of boundary changes

See also
Elections in the Republic of Ireland

References

External links
Summary of boundary revisions

Electoral 1974
1974 in Irish law
Acts of the Oireachtas of the 1970s
Gerrymandering